Trinitasia is a genus of saltwater clams, marine bivalve mollusks in the family Mactridae.

Species
 Trinitasia iheringi (Dall, 1897)

Distribution
This marine species occurs off Brazil.

References

 Maury, C.J. (1928). Trinitasia, a new molluscan genus from South America. Science. 67 (1734), 318.
  Signorelli, J. H.; Pastorino, G. (2012). Taxonomic revision of Brazilian Mactridae Lamarck, 1809 (Bivalvia: Cardiida). Zootaxa. 3245, 30-53. 

Mactridae
Bivalve genera